Quentin Troy Neujahr (born January 30, 1971) is a former American football center who played five seasons in the National Football League with the Baltimore Ravens and Jacksonville Jaguars. He played college football at Kansas State University and attended Centennial High School in Utica, Nebraska. He was also a member of the Los Angeles Raiders, Cleveland Browns and Denver Broncos.

Professional career

Los Angeles Raiders
Neujahr spent the 1994 offseason with the Los Angeles Raiders. He was released by the Raiders on August 23, 1994.

Cleveland Browns
Neujahr spent the 1995 season with the Cleveland Browns.

Baltimore Ravens
Neujahr played from 1996 to 1997 for the Baltimore Ravens, appearing in 14 games and starting seven.

Jacksonville Jaguars
Neujahr played from 1998 to 2000 for the Jacksonville Jaguars, appearing in all 48 games and starting 18. He was released by the Jaguars on February 27, 2001.

Denver Broncos
Neujahr signed with the Denver Broncos on April 3, 2001. He was released by the Broncos on August 28, 2001.

References

External links
Just Sports Stats

Living people
1971 births
Players of American football from Nebraska
American football centers
Kansas State Wildcats football players
Baltimore Ravens players
Jacksonville Jaguars players
People from Seward, Nebraska